"The One Who Really Loves You" is a single recorded by Mary Wells on the Motown label in 1962. It was written and composed by Smokey Robinson of The Miracles and peaked at number eight on the Billboard Hot 100 chart and number two on the Billboard R&B chart.

The song, written by Smokey Robinson, talks about a woman who's telling her boyfriend not to fall for other girls, because they don't want him, and their love isn't true, but hers is, so she's telling him that he "better wake up" before they "break up".

The single was the first of a trio of Top Ten hits with Robinson in the year (followed by "You Beat Me to the Punch" and "Two Lovers"). It featured vibraphone production and brought out a softer sound in Wells' voice that hadn't been shown in her earlier releases. The single was the highest-charting single of her career at the time.

Jessica Sanchez sampled the song for her song "Still in Love".

Personnel
Lead vocal by Mary Wells
Background vocals by The Love Tones (Carl Jones, Joe Miles, and Stan Bracely)
Instrumentation by The Funk Brothers
Written and produced by Smokey Robinson

References

1962 singles
Mary Wells songs
Motown singles
Songs written by Smokey Robinson
Song recordings produced by Smokey Robinson
1962 songs